JArchitect is a static analysis tool for Java code. This tool supports a large number of code metrics, allows for visualization of dependencies using directed graphs and dependency matrix. The tools also performs code base snapshots comparison, and validation of architectural and quality rules. User-defined rules can be written using LINQ queries. This possibility is named CQLinq. The tool also comes with a large number of predefined CQLinq code rules.

Features
The main features of JArchitect are:

 Dependency Visualization (using dependency graphs, and dependency matrix)
 Software metrics (JArchitect currently supports 82 code metrics: Cyclomatic complexity; Afferent and Efferent Coupling; Relational Cohesion; Percentage of code covered by tests, etc.)
 Declarative code rule over LINQ query (CQLinq)
 JArchitect can tell you what has been changed between 2 builds

Code Rule through LINQ Query (CQLinq)

The tool proposes live code query and code rule through LINQ query.
This is one of the innovations of JArchitect. For example:

- Classes inherit from a particular class:

 // classes inherit from a particular class
 from t in Types
 where t.IsClass && t.DeriveFrom ("CBase")
 select t

- The 10 most complex methods (Source Code Cyclomatic complexity)

 // The 10 most complex methods
 (from m in Methods
 orderby 
 select new { m, m.CyclomaticComplexity }).Take(10)

In addition, the tool proposes a live CQLinq query editor with code completion and embedded documentation.

See also
 Design Structure Matrix
 Software visualization

External links

JArchitect Blog
PCWorld Reviews
InfoQ press release
Java Code Geek review
Heise.de Press Release

Static program analysis tools
Software metrics
Java development tools